This Is the World is the second and final studio album by River City People, released by EMI in 1991. It reached No. 56 in the UK and spawned two singles, "Special Way" (UK No. 44) and "Standing in the Need of Love" (UK No. 36).

Critical reception
Upon its release, The Guardian wrote, "Suppose Bono had been Pat Benatar and assuming she was in Dublin at the time, might something like this have been the result? As a follow up to their successful [debut] album, River City People offer This Is the World, and quite clearly a couple of years on the road have given them a new confidence and sharper edge. This album sounds like the work of a band who are enjoying the process of discovering just how good they are." Hi-Fi News & Record Review commented, "The band's second release shows more bite than the far lighter debut, but it's no less melodic. Some suggestions that the band, especially the sterling vocalist, fell in love with the first Texas LP, but otherwise it's the kind of music which should make the band the darlings of the late night campus radio audience." Sally Margaret Joy of Melody Maker felt the album was "pretty boring". She noted Maher's "strong, sensual voice" but felt the album was overproduced in "true Corporate Rock fashion" with "over-cooked arrangements". She praised the track "Hurt You" for how it "swoons and sulks with a sheet-rumpling kind of elegance" and added, "More of this, and the River City People could merit some excessive admiration. But not yet."

Track listing

Personnel
River City People
 Siobhan Maher - vocals
 Tim Speed - guitars, vocals
 David Snell - bass
 Paul Speed - drums, percussion

Production
 David Nicholas - producer (tracks 1-5, 7, 9-11), mixing (tracks 3-11), engineer (tracks 1-4, 7, 9), assistant engineer (tracks 10-11)
 River City People - producers (tracks 1-5, 7, 9-11)
 Marius de Vries, Steve Sidelnyk - producers (track 6), additional production (track 2)
 Steve Ferrera - producer (track 8)
 Chris Sheldon - mixing (tracks 1-2)
 Richard Chappell - engineer (tracks 2, 5), assistant engineer (tracks 1-4, 7)
 Ronni O'Keefe - engineer (tracks 5, 10-11)
 David Chappell - engineer (track 6)
 Nick Davis - mixing (track 8)
 Bob Kraushaar - engineer (track 8)
 Klaus Kummer - assistant engineer (track 8)

Other
 Normal Service - art direction, design, styling
 David Scheinmann - photography

Charts

References

1991 albums
Albums produced by Marius de Vries
EMI Records albums